Sarasota Christian School is a private K-12 Christian school located in Sarasota, Florida.

Demographics
The demographic breakdown of the 348 K-12 students enrolled for 2015-16 was:
Asian - 5.8%
Black - 2.0%
Hispanic - 8.0%
White - 81.3%
Multiracial - 2.9%
NCES does not compile demographic data for preschool students.

Athletics
The Sarasota Christian Blazers school colors are blue and gold. The following Florida High School Athletic Association (FHSAA) sanctioned sports are offered:

Baseball (boys)
Basketball (girls and boys) 
Cross country (girls and boys) 
Golf (girls and boys) 
Soccer (girls and boys) 
Softball (girls) 
Swimming (girls and boys) 
Tennis (girls and boys) 
Volleyball (girls) 
Beach volleyball (girls)

References

External links

Christian schools in Florida
Mennonite schools in the United States
Schools in Sarasota County, Florida
Private high schools in Florida
Private middle schools in Florida
Private elementary schools in Florida
Educational institutions established in 1958
1958 establishments in Florida